Seth Lewelling (1820 – February 21, 1896), alternatively spelled Luelling (including by Lewelling himself), was a pioneer orchardist from the U.S. state of Oregon, best known for developing the Bing cherry. Born in 1820 in North Carolina as Seth Lewelling, he used the spelling Luelling for part of his life but returned to Lewelling in his later years.

Career 

His brother Henderson Luelling (who retained the original spelling of his family's name throughout his life) came to Oregon from Iowa in 1847, bringing fruit trees in his wagon. He established an orchard in Milwaukie, and Seth and their brother John came to Oregon and joined the business in 1847. Seth became the sole owner of the business in 1857 and developed many new varieties of cherries, rhubarb, grapes, and golden prunes. Among the cherries he developed were the Lincoln and the Black Republican. In 1875, he developed the Bing cherry, the most produced sweet cherry cultivar in the United States.The Bing Cherry was develop by Lewelling and his Manchurian Chinese foreman, Ah Bing, whom which the cherry is named for.

Political involvement 
As the names he gave to his cherries might indicate, Lewelling was also involved in the founding of the Oregon Republican Party.

The Lewellings played an important role in Oregon's movement for Initiative and Referendum. In 1892, William S. U'Ren, then a young man, suffered a severe asthma attack, and called upon the Lewellings, who took him into their home and nursed him back to health. They had an abiding interest in political reform, and U'Ren found his life's calling through the discussions at their home; he went on to establish the initiative and referendum system, among other populist reforms.

Death 
Lewelling suffered a paralyzing stroke on July 1, 1895, and died at his home in Milwaukie on February 21, 1896.

Legacy
Seth Lewelling is one of the 158 names of people important to Oregon's history that are painted in the House and Senate chambers of the Oregon State Capitol. Lewelling's name is in the Senate chamber. Seth Lewelling Elementary School and the Lewelling neighborhood in Milwaukie are named for him.

References

External links
 
 

1820 births
1896 deaths
Agriculture in Oregon
Oregon pioneers
Oregon Republicans
People from Milwaukie, Oregon
American orchardists